Miguel Gutiérrez Ortega (born 27 July 2001) is a Spanish professional footballer who mainly plays as a left-back for La Liga club Girona.

Club career

Real Madrid 
A native of Madrid, Spain, Gutiérrez started out at the academy of Getafe before joining Real Madrid in 2011. In July 2017 the then Manchester United coach José Mourinho was interested in the signing of the young Spaniard, but the 16-year-old eventually decided to stay at Real Madrid.

During the summer of 2019, Gutiérrez was propelled into the first team by coach Zinedine Zidane to participate in the Audi Cup, following the injury of newcomer Ferland Mendy. He then was the first player from a Real Madrid training center born in 2001 to join the first team.

He made his professional debut for Real Madrid on 21 April 2021, coming on as a substitute in a 3–0 win over Cádiz. His first start came on 15 May 2021, in a 4–1 victory at Granada.

Girona
On 5 August 2022, Gutiérrez signed for Girona on a contract until 30 June 2027, with Real Madrid retaining 50% of his rights and a sell-on clause.

Club statistics

Honours

Real Madrid
UEFA Champions League: 2021–22

Real Madrid Juvenil A
UEFA Youth League: 2019–20

Spain U19
UEFA European Under-19 Championship: 2019

References

External links

2001 births
Living people
Spanish footballers
Association football defenders
Footballers from Madrid
Real Madrid Castilla footballers
Real Madrid CF players
La Liga players
Segunda División B players
Primera Federación players
Spain youth international footballers
Spain under-21 international footballers